A whistle stop or whistle-stop tour is a style of political campaigning where the politician makes a series of brief appearances or speeches at a number of small towns over a short period of time. Originally, whistle-stop appearances were made from the open platform of an observation car or a private railroad car.

Definition and usage
The definition of the term derives from the practice of a small, occasionally used railway station signaling a train so the engineer will know to stop. Trains inbound to a "whistle stop" station would signal their approach with a blast of the train's steam whistle which would alert the train depot attendant to their arrival. If passengers, mail, or freight waited to be picked up at the depot, the depot master would raise a tower signal to indicate to the train engineer that the train should stop. If no stop was necessary, a different signal would be raised and the engineer could pass through the depot without stopping.

One usage of the term in the political context, by Robert A. Taft, was derisive. He accused then-President Harry S. Truman of "blackguarding Congress at whistle stops across the country".

Background

In the 19th century, when travel by railroad was the most common means of transport, politicians would charter tour trains which would travel from town to town. At each stop, the candidate would make a speech from the train, but might rarely set foot on the ground.  "Whistle stop" campaign speeches would be made from the rear platform of a train.

One of the most famous railroad cars to be used in the U.S. whistle-stop tours was the Ferdinand Magellan, the only car custom built for the President of the United States in the 20th century. Originally built in 1928 by the Pullman Company and officially the "U.S. No. 1 Presidential Railcar", the Ferdinand Magellan is on display at the Gold Coast Railroad Museum in Miami, Florida. The famous news photo of Harry S Truman holding up a copy of the Chicago Tribune with a banner headline stating "Dewey Defeats Truman" was taken on this platform on Wednesday, November 3, 1948, at St. Louis Union Station. The Ferdinand Magellan was also used by President Franklin D. Roosevelt and, to a much lesser extent, by President Dwight Eisenhower. President Ronald Reagan used the Magellan for one day, October 12, 1984, traveling 120 miles in Ohio, from Dayton to Perrysburg, making five stops to give "whistle stop" speeches along the way.

Modern whistle-stop tours
The future Charles III of the United Kingdom started a five-day whistle-stop tour of the United Kingdom on Monday, 6 September 2010, with a speech in Glasgow when he was Prince of Wales. The green campaigning tour was a part of the Prince's Start initiative that aimed to build public awareness of sustainable activities. 

In Europe, touring politicians still occasionally take a train, as the excellent, dense railway network offers access comparable to road travel and as it is better suited for extensive trips than air travel. In 2009, for example, German chancellor (and CDU candidate) Angela Merkel made a highly publicized tour in Konrad Adenauer's old campaign train. The SPD, on the other hand, discontinued the use of train tours for campaigns before the 1998 election.

On September 30, 2020, after the first presidential debate against Donald Trump, Democratic presidential candidate Joe Biden rode on an Amtrak "Build Back Better Express" from Cleveland, Ohio, to Johnstown, Pennsylvania.

Gallery
The following are examples of whistle-stop train tours:

References

External links
 

Articles containing video clips
Political terminology of the United States
History of rail transportation in the United States